S-phase kinase-associated protein 1  is an enzyme that in humans is encoded by the SKP1 gene.

This gene encodes a protein that is a member of the SCF ubiquitin ligase protein complex. It binds to F-box proteins (proteins containing an F-box motif), such as cyclin F, S-phase kinase-associated protein 2, and other regulatory proteins involved in ubiquitin dependent proteolysis. The encoded protein also collaborates with a network of proteins to control beta-catenin levels and affects the activity level of beta-catenin dependent TCF transcription factors. Studies have also characterized the protein as an RNA polymerase II elongation factor. Alternative splicing of this gene results in two transcript variants. A related pseudogene has been identified on chromosome 7.

Interactions 

SKP1A has been shown to interact with:

 BTRC, 
 CACYBP, 
 CDCA3, 
 CDK9, 
 CUL1, 
 FBXL3, 
 FBXO4, 
 FBXO5, 
 FBXO7, 
 FBXW2, 
 FBXW7, and
 SKP2.

References

Further reading

External links